Budiriro is a high density suburb in the southwestern area of Harare in Zimbabwe. There are about 30,000 houses but only two clinics and five elementary schools.

Budiriro is the site of a housing project for low-income earners with almost 2,000 homes sold in April 2018.

In 2008, Budiriro had the highest number of cholera outbreaks. accounting for 50% of the reported cases in Zimbabwe. Another common disease in Budiriro is typhoid.

In late 2016, most of the suburb was affected by flash flooding.

References 

Suburbs of Harare